Jean Carlos Alves Coral (born 2 January 1988) is a Brazilian former professional footballer who played as a forward.

References

1988 births
Living people
Brazilian footballers
Association football forwards
Campeonato Brasileiro Série B players
Primeira Liga players
Criciúma Esporte Clube players
Vitória S.C. players
Botafogo de Futebol e Regatas players
Esporte Clube Juventude players
Brazilian expatriate footballers
Brazilian expatriate sportspeople in Portugal
Expatriate footballers in Portugal